The 2023 Koblenz Open was a professional tennis tournament played on indoor hard courts. It was the fifth edition of the tournament which was part of the 2023 ATP Challenger Tour. It took place in Koblenz, Germany from 30 January to 5 February 2023.

Singles main-draw entrants

Seeds

 1 Rankings are as of 16 January 2023.

Other entrants
The following players received wildcards into the singles main draw:
  Max Hans Rehberg
  Henri Squire
  Marko Topo

The following players received entry into the singles main draw as alternates:
  Raphaël Collignon
  Lucas Gerch
  Robin Haase
  Daniel Masur
  Louis Wessels

The following players received entry from the qualifying draw:
  Johannes Härteis
  Antoine Hoang
  Mats Rosenkranz
  Vitaliy Sachko
  Alexey Vatutin
  Denis Yevseyev

Champions

Singles

 Roman Safiullin def.  Vasek Pospisil 6–2, 7–5.

Doubles

 Fabian Fallert /  Hendrik Jebens def.  Jonathan Eysseric /  Denys Molchanov 7–6(7–2), 6–3.

References

2023 ATP Challenger Tour
2023
January 2023 sports events in Germany
February 2023 sports events in Germany